Burgdorfer Aue is a river of Lower Saxony, Germany. It discharges into the Fuhsekanal, which flows into the Aller west of Celle.

See also
List of rivers of Lower Saxony

Rivers of Lower Saxony
Rivers of Germany